The Red Lake County Courthouse, located at 124 Langevin Avenue Red Lake Falls, Red Lake County in the U.S. state of Minnesota is a red brick Beaux Arts building featuring a small dome at each corner.  Originally the building also had a large central dome, but it was removed in the 1940s. The courthouse was completed in 1911 at a cost of $37,070. The building was designed by Fremont D. Orff and James Brady. The front entrance of the courthouse is flanked by faux columns, topped by a classic pediment. The interior atrium is open to a two-story rotunda with arched openings to the second-level walkway.

References

Beaux-Arts architecture in Minnesota
Buildings and structures in Red Lake County, Minnesota
County courthouses in Minnesota
Courthouses on the National Register of Historic Places in Minnesota
Government buildings completed in 1911
1911 establishments in Minnesota
National Register of Historic Places in Red Lake County, Minnesota